Canthigaster smithae, known as the bicolored toby, is a species of pufferfish in the family Tetraodontidae native to the Indian Ocean. It ranges from Agaléga, Mauritius to Durban, South Africa, as well as the Maldives. It is a reef-associated species found at a depth of 20 to 40 m (66 to 131 ft), where it typically occurs alone near rubble and steep rock walls. It is oviparous and reaches 13 cm (5.1 inches) in total length.

References 

smithae
Fish described in 1977
Fish of the Indian Ocean